Assmaa Niang (also spelled Asmaa or Asma, born 4 January 1983) is a Moroccan judoka.

She competed at the 2016 Summer Olympics in Rio de Janeiro, in the women's 70 kg.

She competed in the women's 70 kg event at the 2020 Summer Olympics.

References

External links

 
 
 
 

  

1983 births
Living people
Moroccan female judoka
Olympic judoka of Morocco
Judoka at the 2016 Summer Olympics
Mediterranean Games bronze medalists for Morocco
Mediterranean Games medalists in judo
Competitors at the 2013 Mediterranean Games
Competitors at the 2018 Mediterranean Games
Judoka at the 2020 Summer Olympics
21st-century Moroccan women